The Planning etc. (Scotland) Act 2006 is an Act of the Scottish Parliament, one effect of which was the creation of four Strategic Development Planning Authorities. These bodies each comprise several local planning authorities and are charged with producing long-term development plans for the following city-regions
 Glasgow and the Clyde Valley
 Aberdeen City and Shire
 Dundee, Perth, Angus and North Fife
 Edinburgh and South East Scotland

References

External links
 Glasgow and the Clyde Valley Strategic Development Planning Authority
 Aberdeen City and Shire Strategic Development Planning Authority
 Tayplan (Dundee, Perth, Angus and North Fife Strategic Development Planning Authority)
 SESPlan (Edinburgh and South East Scotland Strategic Development Planning Authority)

UK (Scotland) Legislation 
 

Acts of the Scottish Parliament 2006